Anne Lindboe (born 1 August 1971) is a Norwegian paediatrician, and was the Norwegian Children's Ombudsman 2012–2018.

Early life, education and medical career 

Anne Lindboe grew up in Revetal, Vestfold. Her parents were teachers. As a young girl she sang in the Sandefjord Jentekor.

She obtained the cand.med. (MD) degree at the University of Oslo in 2000, and also holds an MBA in Management from the Norwegian School of Economics. She was approved as a specialist in paediatrics in 2011.

From 2008 to 2011, she was a consultant at Statens Barnehus Oslo, and from 2010 also a researcher at the Norwegian Institute of Public Health. She worked as an intern at Bærum Hospital 2001–2002 and as an assistant physician at Drammen Hospital 2002–2003 and Ullevål University Hospital 2004–2007. In 2010, she admitted to the PhD programme at the University of Oslo, but has not completed a doctorate.

Children's Ombudsman 

She has compared long time child custody conflicts to child neglect, and has suggested that mediation between parents should be mandatory before such cases are brought in for court.

In  summer 2012, she was interviewed for Vårt Land (Norwegian newspaper), where she demanded that religious male circumcision changes in symbolic term. Invited in Helsinki at NOCIRC & Sexpo (organisation) symposium, 2 October 2012, Anne Lindboe confirmed that  she was approached by the Simon Wiesenthal Centre but upheld her view that traditional male circumcision should be banned. 
In 2013 Anne Lindboe and the children's ombudsmen from Sweden, Finland, Denmark and Iceland along with the Chair of the Danish Children's Council and the children's spokesperson for Greenland passed a resolution to "Let boys decide for themselves whether they want to be circumcised."  They further declared that "Circumcision without a medical indication on a person unable to provide informed consent conflicts with basic principles of medical ethics."

Personal 

Anne Lindboe is married and has three children. The family lives in Ullevål Hageby, Oslo.

References

External links
Interview with Paul Mason
 norway ombudsman site

1971 births
Living people
University of Oslo alumni
Norwegian School of Economics alumni
Norwegian pediatricians
Oslo University Hospital people
Directors of government agencies of Norway
Children's rights activists
Children's Ombudsmen in Norway
Norwegian women physicians